Alfie Moore is an English ex-police officer, writer, stand-up comedian and radio presenter.

Career
Moore spent over twenty years on the Humberside Police force before turning to stand up comedy.

Moore first appeared on the ITV show Show Me the Funny   hosted by Jason Manford and has since appeared as a guest on The Wright Stuff, Sky News Paper Review, Comic Relief, ITV News Calendar and Look North. More recently a presenter on Channel 5 show Caught on Camera.

Moore has been guest comedian on radio programmes, including Today (BBC Radio 4), The Richard Bacon Show on BBC 5 Live, The Jeremy Vine Show on BBC Radio 2 as well as hosting his own stand-up comedy show on BBC Radio 4 called Alfie Moore – It's a Fair Cop which is now on series 7.
 
Moore has taken four shows to the Edinburgh Festival. In 2012 I Predicted a Riot and 2013 Viva Alf's Vegas with Phil McIntyre Ents as Promoter, and in 2014 The Naked Stun with Mick Perrin Worldwide as Promoter which sold out for 25 nights and was awarded the Edinburgh Fringe laurel for a sell-out show. Moore's 2015 Edinburgh Festival show was called Alfie Moore - A Fair Cop Stands Up. Later tours included The Naked Stun and Getting Away with Murder.
His latest tour 'Fair Cop Unleashed' is based on a true story. Spring/summer dates are currently being rescheduled for autumn due to the coronavirus outbreak.

Moore has supported Sarah Millican, Russell Kane and Milton Jones on their national comedy tours.

References

External links

Official website

British police officers
British radio personalities
English male comedians
English stand-up comedians
English writers
Living people
People from Scunthorpe
1968 births